Eclipsis is a genus of robber flies in the family Asilidae. There is at least one described species in Eclipsis, E. maculiventris.

References

Further reading

External links

 
 

Asilidae genera